Thomas Story Kirkbride (July 31, 1809December 16, 1883) was a physician, alienist, hospital superintendent for the Institute of the Pennsylvania Hospital, and primary founder of the Association of Medical Superintendents of American Institutions for the Insane (AMSAII), the organizational precursor to the American Psychiatric Association. Along with Dr. Benjamin Rush he is considered to be the father of the modern American practice of psychiatry as a specific medical discipline. His directive and organization of institutions for the insane were the gold-standard of clinical care in psychiatry throughout the 19th century.

Early career
Kirkbride was born on July 31, 1809, on a farm in Morrisville, Pennsylvania into a wealthy Orthodox Quaker family. He was the son of John Kirkbride and Elizabeth Story, and resided on the family farm outside of Newtown, Pennsylvania along with his younger sister Rachel Story Kirkbride. He received his primary education at the Quaker school at Fallsington and later at Trenton Academy. His great-great-grandfather, Joseph Kirkbride (1662-1736) was one of the original settlers of Pennsylvania with a land grant from William Penn in 1682. When he was 18 years old, he started his formal education under Dr. Nicholas Belleville of Trenton, New Jersey and the Presbyterian minister, Rev. Jared D. Tyler at the College of New Jersey. He was enrolled at the medical school at the University of Pennsylvania in August 1831, receiving a medical degree in March 1832. Following his academic coursework he was assigned as a medical resident at the Quaker Asylum at Frankford (now Friends Hospital). Kirkbride operated his own medical-surgical practice in the city of Philadelphia from 1835 to 1841 that focused mainly on neurological and psycho-surgical interventions. He was honored with a membership to the American Philosophical Society in 1851, and national award rarely granted to physicians. Kirkbride was also the Vice President of the Pennsylvania Institution for the Instruction of the Blind (now known as Overbrook School for the Blind from 1844 until his death in 1883.

Professional practice
In October 1840, Kirkbride was named the first superintendent of the Pennsylvania Hospital for the Insane by the Board of Managers of Pennsylvania Hospital.  In January 1841, the first patients were admitted to the ward to offer relief to the site of Pennsylvania Hospital's South Philadelphia campus.

In Philadelphia, Pennsylvania, during October 1844, Kirkbride helped found the Association of Medical Superintendents of American Institutions for the Insane (AMSAII).  He held the position of secretary for seven years, treasurer, vice president for two years, and president for eight years between 1862 and 1870. Kirkbride pioneered what would be known as the Kirkbride Plan, which aimed to improve medical care for the insane, through standardization of buildings that housed patients.

Kirkbride's magnum opus, On the Construction, Organization, and General Arrangements of Hospitals for the Insane with Some Remarks on Insanity and Its Treatment, was published in 1854, and again in 1880, and was the source book for 19th century psychiatric directives.

Towards the end of his life, Lafayette College awarded him an LL.D "in recognition of his eminent ability and the remarkable services rendered to suffering humanity". In 1874, he addressed the legislature of the Commonwealth of Pennsylvania, advocating for the expansion of state-sponsored clinical care for the insane. His efforts, and that of his medical peers, saw the allocation of funds for Norristown State Hospital in 1878. Subsequent to this appeal, he was offered the position of superintendent of the male department of the new state hospital, which he declined, preferring to maintain his inpatient practice in Philadelphia.

Personal life
Kirkbride was devoutly religious and a lifelong member of the Religious Society of Friends, attending services at the Twelfth Street Meeting House from 1833 until his death. Kirkbride also had his funeral services conducted at this Orthodox Friends meetinghouse. He married Ann West Jenks (1812-1862) in 1839. Together, they had two children: Ann Jenks Kirkbride, who was born in 1840, and Joseph John Kirkbride, who was born in 1842.  After Ann died, he married Eliza Ogden Butler (1835-1919), one of his former patients. Together, they had four children: Franklin Butler Kirkbride in 1867, Thomas Story Kirkbride, Jr in 1869, Mary Butler Kirkbride in 1874, and Elizabeth Butler Kirkbride in 1875.

Kirkbride experienced a prolonged respiratory illness starting in June 1883, which continued until his death from pneumonia on December 16, 1883, at his home on the grounds of the Pennsylvania Hospital for the Insane.  His eldest son, Joseph, followed in his father's footsteps, attending both the University of Pennsylvania and Philadelphia College of Pharmacy, becoming a physician as well at in the outpatient department of Pennsylvania Hospital. His younger son, Thomas S. Kirkbride, Jr. (d. 1900) also became a physician and Urologist. His grave in Laurel Hill is plain in the Quaker-style, saving only the inclusion of "Doctor of Medicine" after his name.

Select professional publications
 Kirkbride, T.S. (1843). Reports of the Pennsylvania Hospital for the Insane for the year 1843. University of Pennsylvania Press, Philadelphia, PA
 Kirkbride, T.S. (1845). Proceedings of the Association of Medical Superintendents of American Institutions for the Insane. American Journal of the Medical Sciences, XI(1), p. 249-250
 Kirkbride, T.S. (1846). Reports of the Pennsylvania Hospital for the Insane: with a sketch of its history, buildings, and organization. University of Pennsylvania Press, Philadelphia, PA
 Kirkbride, T.S. (1848). Editorial and American Medical Retrospect. The New York Journal of Medicine, I(3), p. 247-250
 Kirkbride, T.S. (1850). Notice of some Experiments in Heating and Ventilating Hospitals and other Buildings, by Steam and Hot Water. With Remarks. The American Journal of the Medical Sciences, p. 298-319
 Kirkbride, T.S. (1850). Reports of the Pennsylvania Hospital for the Insane for 1842, 1846, 1847, 1849, 1850. University of Pennsylvania Press, Philadelphia, PA
 Kirkbride, T.S. (1854). On the Construction, Organization, and General Arrangements of Hospitals for the Insane with Some Remarks on Insanity and Its Treatment. Lindsay & Blakiston, Philadelphia, PA
 Kirkbride, T.S. (1854). Letter to the Regents of the South Carolina Hospital for the Insane. TK and PG Collins Printers, Columbia, SC
 Kirkbride, T.S. (1855). Reports of the Pennsylvania Hospital for the Insane for the year 1854. University of Pennsylvania Press, Philadelphia, PA
 Kirkbride, T.S. (1866). Biographical memoir of the late William Pepper, M.D. Collins Printer, Philadelphia, PA
 Kirkbride, T.S.; Ray, I.; Reed, J.A.; Worthington, J.H. (1874). To the Senate and House of Representatives of the Commonwealth of Pennsylvania : the undersigned, citizens of Pennsylvania, who are, or have been, actively engaged in the care of the insane. Published on behalf of the Commonwealth of Pennsylvania for legislative audience on Feb. 19, 1874
 Kirkbride, T.S. (1881). Memoir of Isaac Ray, M.D., LL. D. : read before the College of Physicians of Philadelphia, July 6, 1881. Collins Printer, Philadelphia, PA
 Curwen, J.; Kirkbride, T.S. (1885). Memoir of Thomas S. Kirkbride MC LLD. E. Cowan & Co. Printers, Warren, PA

References

External links
 Virginia Commonwealth University- Thomas S. Kirkbride
 Pennsylvania Hospital- Biography on Kirkbride
 Asylum Projects- Thomas Story Kirkbride

American psychiatrists
American Quakers
1809 births
1883 deaths
 
Physicians from Philadelphia
Presidents of the American Psychiatric Association
People from Morrisville, Pennsylvania
Perelman School of Medicine at the University of Pennsylvania alumni
Deaths from pneumonia in Pennsylvania